The following article outlines statistics for UEFA Euro 2020, which took place across Europe from 11 June to 11 July 2021 after being postponed by a year due to the COVID-19 pandemic. Goals scored during penalty shoot-outs are not counted, and matches decided by a penalty shoot-out are considered draws.

Goalscorers

Assists

Clean sheets

Awards

Man of the Match

Scoring
Overview

Timing

Teams

Individual

Attendance
Overall attendance: 1,099,278
Average attendance per match: 
Highest attendance: 67,173 – Italy vs England
Lowest attendance: 5,607 – Croatia vs Czech Republic

Wins and losses

Discipline

Summary

Sanctions

By match

By referee

By team

By individual

Overall statistics

Notes

References

External links
 UEFA Euro 2020 statistics at UEFA.com

Statistics
2020